Finland competed at the inaugural Summer Paralympic Games in 1960 in Rome. Like Rhodesia and  Ireland, it sent only one competitor: swimmer Tauno Valkama. He entered a single event, the 50m crawl (class 4), and won gold - giving his country a perfect success rate for its first Paralympics.

Medallists

Swimming 

Just like all other events at the 1960 Paralympics, swimming races were held with no more than three swimmers per event, thereby guaranteeing a medal to every swimmer completing his or her race. In his sole event, Valkama competed against two Americans: R. Maduro and Hall (full names not recorded).

Valkama was a clear winner, completing the race in exactly 51 seconds, making Finland's only medal at the 1960 Games a gold. Maduro finished in 57.7s, beating his compatriot for silver; Hall swam the race in 59.8s, for bronze.

See also
Finland at the 1960 Summer Olympics

References

External links

International Paralympic Committee official website

Nations at the 1960 Summer Paralympics
1960
Paralympics